A casino is a facility for certain types of gambling. Casinos are often built near or combined with hotels, resorts, restaurants, retail shopping, cruise ships, and other tourist attractions. Some casinos are also known for hosting live entertainment, such as stand-up comedy, concerts, and sports.

and usage
Casino is of Italian origin; the root  means a house. The term casino may mean a small country villa, summerhouse, or social club. During the 19th century, casino came to include other public buildings where pleasurable activities took place; such edifices were usually built on the grounds of a larger Italian villa or palazzo, and were used to host civic town functions, including dancing, gambling, music listening, and sports. Examples in Italy include Villa Farnese and Villa Giulia, and in the US the Newport Casino in Newport, Rhode Island.

Not all casinos are used for gaming. The Catalina Casino, on Santa Catalina Island, California, has never been used for traditional games of chance, which were already outlawed in California by the time it was built. The Copenhagen Casino was a Danish theatre which also held public meetings during the 1848 Revolution, which made Denmark a constitutional monarchy.

History of gambling houses

The precise origin of gambling is unknown. It is generally believed that gambling in some form or another has been seen in almost every society in history. From Ancient Mesopotamia, Greeks and Romans to Napoleon's France and Elizabethan England, much of history is filled with stories of entertainment based on games of chance.

The first known European gambling house, not called a casino although meeting the modern definition, was the Ridotto, established in Venice, Italy, in 1638 by the Great Council of Venice to provide controlled gambling during the carnival season. It was closed in 1774 as the city government felt it was impoverishing the local gentry.

In American history, early gambling establishments were known as saloons. The creation and importance of saloons was greatly influenced by four major cities: New Orleans, St. Louis, Chicago and San Francisco. It was in the saloons that travelers could find people to talk to, drink with, and often gamble with. During the early 20th century in the US, gambling was outlawed by state legislation. However, in 1931, gambling was legalized throughout the state of Nevada, where the US's first legalized casinos were set up. In 1976 New Jersey allowed gambling in Atlantic City, now the US's second largest gambling city.

Gambling in casinos

Most jurisdictions worldwide have a minimum gambling age of 18 to 21.

Customers gamble by playing games of chance, in some cases with an element of skill, such as craps, roulette, baccarat, blackjack, and video poker. Most games have mathematically determined odds that ensure the house has at all times an advantage over the players. This can be expressed more precisely by the notion of expected value, which is uniformly negative (from the player's perspective). This advantage is called the house edge. In games such as poker where players play against each other, the house takes a commission called the rake. Casinos sometimes give out complimentary items or comps to gamblers.

Payout is the percentage of funds ("winnings") returned to players.

Casinos in the United States say that a player staking money won from the casino is playing with the house's money.

Video Lottery Machines (slot machines) have become one of the most popular forms of gambling in casinos.  investigative reports have started calling into question whether the modern-day slot-machine is addictive.

Design
Casino design—regarded as a psychological exercise—is an intricate process that involves optimising floor plan, décor and atmospherics to encourage gambling.

Factors influencing gambling tendencies include sound, odour and lighting. Natasha Dow Schüll, an anthropologist at the Massachusetts Institute of Technology, highlights the decision of the audio directors at Silicon Gaming to make its slot machines resonate in "the universally pleasant tone of C, sampling existing casino soundscapes to create a sound that would please but not clash".

Alan Hirsch, founder of the Smell & Taste Treatment and Research Foundation in Chicago, studied the impact of certain scents on gamblers, discerning that a pleasant albeit unidentifiable odor released by Las Vegas slot machines generated about 50% more in daily revenue. He suggested that the scent acted as an aphrodisiac, causing a more aggressive form of gambling.

Markets
The following lists major casino markets in the world with casino revenue of over US$1 billion as published in PricewaterhouseCoopers's report on
the outlook for the global casino market:

By region

By markets

By company
According to Bloomberg, accumulated revenue of the biggest casino operator companies worldwide amounted to almost US$55 billion in 2011. SJM Holdings Ltd. was the leading company in this field, earning $9.7 bn in 2011, followed by Las Vegas Sands Corp. at $7.4 bn. The third-biggest casino operator company (based on revenue) was Caesars Entertainment, with revenue of US$6.2 bn.

Significant sites
While there are casinos in many places, a few places have become well known specifically for gambling. Perhaps the place almost defined by its casino is Monte Carlo, but other places are known as gambling centers.

Monte Carlo, Monaco

Monte Carlo Casino, located in Monte Carlo city, in Monaco, is a casino and a tourist attraction.

Monte Carlo Casino has been depicted in many books, including Ben Mezrich's Busting Vegas, where a group of Massachusetts Institute of Technology students beat the casino out of nearly $1 million. This book is based on real people and events; however, many of those events are contested by main character Semyon Dukach. Monte Carlo Casino has also been featured in multiple James Bond novels and films.

The casino is mentioned in the song "The Man Who Broke the Bank at Monte Carlo" as well as the film of the same name.

Campione d'Italia

Casinò di Campione is located in the tiny Italian enclave of Campione d'Italia, within Ticino, Switzerland. The casino was founded in 1917 as a site to gather information from foreign diplomats during the First World War. Today it is owned by the Italian government, and operated by the municipality. With gambling laws being less strict than in Italy and Switzerland, it is among the most popular gambling destination besides Monte Carlo. The income from the casino is sufficient for the operation of Campione without the imposition of taxes, or obtaining of other revenue. The new casino was built alongside the old one, which dated from 1933 and has since been demolished.

Malta
The archipelago of Malta is a particularly famous place for casinos, standing out mainly with the historic casino located at the princely residence of Dragonara. Dragonara Palace was built in 1870. Its name comes from the Dragonara Point, the peninsula where it is built. On 15 July 1964, the palace opened as a casino.

Macau

The former Portuguese colony of Macau, a special administrative region of the People's Republic of China since 1999, is a popular destination for visitors who wish to gamble. This started in Portuguese times, when Macau was popular with visitors from nearby Hong Kong, where gambling was more closely regulated. The Venetian Macao is currently the largest casino in the world. Macau also surpassed Las Vegas as the largest gambling market in the world.

Germany
Machine-based gaming is only permitted in land-based casinos, restaurants, bars and gaming halls, and only subject to a licence. Online slots are, at the moment, only permitted if they are operated under a Schleswig-Holstein licence. AWPs are governed by federal law – the Trade Regulation Act and the Gaming Ordinance.

Portugal

The Casino Estoril, located in the municipality of Cascais, on the Portuguese Riviera, near Lisbon, is the largest casino in Europe by capacity.

During the Second World War, it was reputed to be a gathering point for spies, dispossessed royals, and wartime adventurers; it became an inspiration for Ian Fleming's James Bond 007 novel Casino Royale.

Singapore

Singapore is an up-and-coming destination for visitors wanting to gamble, although there are currently only two casinos (both foreign owned), in Singapore. The Marina Bay Sands is the most expensive standalone casino in the world, at a price of US$8 billion, and is among the world's ten most expensive buildings. The Resorts World Sentosa has the world's largest oceanarium.

Russia

There are four legal gaming zones in Russia: "Siberian Coin" (Altay), "Yantarnaya" (Kaliningrad region), "Azov-city" (Rostov region) and "Primorie" (Primorie region).

United States

With currently over 1,000 casinos, the United States has the largest number of casinos in the world. The number continues to grow steadily as more states seek to legalize casinos. 40 states now have some form of casino gambling. Interstate competition, such as gaining tourism, has been a driving factor to continuous legalization.  Relatively small places such as Las Vegas are best known for gambling; larger cities such as Chicago are not defined by their casinos in spite of the large turnover.

The Las Vegas Valley has the largest concentration of casinos in the United States. Based on revenue, Atlantic City, New Jersey ranks second, and the Chicago region third.

Top American casino markets by revenue (2022 annual revenues):

 Las Vegas Strip $7.05 billion
 Atlantic City $2.57 billion
 Chicago region $2.01 billion
 Baltimore–Washington Metropolitan Area $2.00 billion
 Mississippi Gulf Coast $1.61 billion
 New York City $1.46 billion
 Philadelphia $1.40 billion
 Detroit $1.29 billion
 St. Louis $1.03 billion
 Boulder Strip $967 million
 Reno/Sparks $889 million
 Kansas City $861 million
 The Poconos $849 million
 Lake Charles, Louisiana $843 million
 Black Hawk/Central City $812 million
 Downtown Las Vegas $731 million
 Tunica/Lula $696 million
 Cincinnati $655 million
 Shreveport/Bossier City $646 million
 Pittsburgh/Meadowlands $630 million

The Nevada Gaming Control Board divides Clark County, which is coextensive with the Las Vegas metropolitan area, into seven market regions for reporting purposes.

Native American gaming has been responsible for a rise in the number of casinos outside of Las Vegas and Atlantic City.

Security

Given the large amounts of currency handled within a casino, both patrons and staff may be tempted to cheat and steal, in collusion or independently; most casinos have security measures to prevent this. Security cameras located throughout the casino are the most basic measure.

Modern casino security is usually divided between a physical security force and a specialized surveillance department. The physical security force usually patrols the casino and responds to calls for assistance and reports of suspicious or definite criminal activity. A specialized surveillance department operates the casino's closed circuit television system, known in the industry as the eye in the sky. Both of these specialized casino security departments work very closely with each other to ensure the safety of both guests and the casino's assets, and have been quite successful in preventing crime. Some casinos also have catwalks in the ceiling above the casino floor, which allow surveillance personnel to look directly down, through one way glass, on the activities at the tables and slot machines.

When it opened in 1989, The Mirage was the first casino to use cameras full-time on all table games.

In addition to cameras and other technological measures, casinos also enforce security through rules of conduct and behavior; for example, players at card games are required to keep the cards they are holding in their hands visible at all times.

Business practices
Over the past few decades, casinos have developed many different marketing techniques for attracting and maintaining loyal patrons. Many casinos use a loyalty rewards program used to track players' spending habits and target their patrons more effectively, by sending mailings with free slot play and other promotions.  Casino Helsinki in Helsinki, Finland, for example, donates all of its profits to charity.

Crime
Casinos have been linked to organised crime, with early casinos in Las Vegas originally dominated by the American Mafia and in Macau by Triad syndicates.

According to some police reports, local incidence of reported crime often doubles or triples within three years of a casino's opening. In a 2004 report by the US Department of Justice, researchers interviewed people who had been arrested in Las Vegas and Des Moines and found that the percentage of problem or pathological gamblers among the arrestees was three to five times higher than in the general population.

It has been said that economic studies showing a positive relationship between casinos and crime usually fail to consider the visiting population: they count crimes committed by visitors but do not count visitors in the population measure, which overstates the crime rate. Part of the reason this methodology is used, despite the overstatement, is that reliable data on tourist count are often not available.

Occupational health and safety 

There are unique occupational health issues in the casino industry. The most common are from cancers resulting from exposure to second-hand tobacco smoke and musculoskeletal injury (MSI) from repetitive motion injuries while running table games over many hours.

Gallery

See also

 American Gaming Association
 Black Book (gaming)
 Casino hotel
 List of casino hotels
 Casino token
 European Gaming & Amusement Federation
 Gambling in Macau
 Gambling
 Gaming in Mexico
 Gambling in the United States
 Gambling in Manila
 Gaming Control Boards
 Gaming law
 Global Gaming Expo
 List of casinos
 Locals casino
 Native American gaming
 Online casino
 Online gambling
 Online poker
 Sports betting

References

External links

 

 
Gambling